Lake Gileppe is located in Wallonia, in the east of Belgium, near the city of Verviers. There is a 78 m high panoramic tower with a restaurant on the top to look at the lake and the landscape. The water volume is 26,400,000 m³ and the area is 1,3 km².

See also
 

RGileppe
Gileppe
Gileppe
Gileppe
de:Gileppe-Talsperre
lb:Gileppetalspär
nl:Gileppestuwdam